Romania is scheduled to compete at the 2024 Summer Olympics in Paris from 26 July to 11 August 2024, celebrating the centenary of the team's official debut in the same venue. Although the nation's participation started in 1900, Romanian athletes have appeared in every edition of the Summer Olympic Games from 1924 onwards, except for two different occasions: the 1932 Summer Olympics in Los Angeles at the period of the worldwide Great Depression, and the 1948 Summer Olympics in London.

Competitors
The following is the list of number of competitors in the Games.

Athletics

Romanian track and field athletes achieved the entry standards for Paris 2024, either by passing the direct qualifying mark (or time for track and road races) or by world ranking, in the following events (a maximum of 3 athletes each):

Track and road events

References

2024
Nations at the 2024 Summer Olympics